The 2020 World's Strongest Man was the 43rd edition of the World's Strongest Man competition. It took place in Bradenton, Florida between November 11 and 15. Oleksii Novikov of Ukraine won the competition for the first time in his career, with Tom Stoltman of Great Britain taking second and Jean-Francois Caron of Canada taking third. At 24 years old, Novikov is the youngest person to win the event since 1984.

Scheduling and participants
The event "was originally scheduled to take place May 20 to 24 in Bradenton, Florida," but was postponed due to the COVID-19 pandemic. The actual event itself also experienced scheduling issues because of Hurricane Eta. 

Defending champion Martins Licis and two-time runner up Mateusz Kieliszkowski did not take part this year due to injury. 2018 champion Hafþór Júlíus Björnsson did not take part after announcing his retirement.

Heat Results

Format
There are five competitors per group. After four events, the competitor with the highest score qualifies for the final. The competitors in second and third place take part in the Stone Off, a run of loading 8 Atlas Stones, with the winner progressing.

Heat 1
Events: Farmer's Walk, Deadlift for repetitions, Loading Race, Log Lift for repetitions.

Stone Off

Heat 2
Events: Farmer's Walk, Deadlift for repetitions, Loading Race, Dumbbell Press Medley.

Stone Off

Heat 3
Events: Farmer's Walk, Squat Lift for repetitions, Loading Race, Dumbbell Press Medley.

 
Stone Off

Heat 4
Events: Farmer's Walk, Squat Lift for repetitions, Loading Race, Log Lift for repetitions.

Stone Off

Heat 5
Events: Farmer's Walk, Deadlift for repetitions, Loading Race, Dumbbell Press Medley.

Stone Off

Finals Events Results

Event 1: Giant's Medley
Weight:  anvil,  yoke
Course Length:  anvil,  yoke
Time Limit: 75 seconds

Event 2: Max Deadlift
 18-Inch Deadlift For Max Weight
 Opening Weight:

Event 3: Keg Toss
Weight: 8 kegs ranging from 
Height: 
Time Limit: 60 seconds

Event 4: Hercules Hold
Weight:  on each hand for as long as possible

Event 5: Log Ladder
Weight: 5 logs ranging from 
Time Limit: 75 seconds

Event 6: Atlas Stones
Weight: 5 stones ranging from 
Time Limit: 60 seconds
Total Weight:

Records
As part of the deadlift event, Novikov successfully performed a  18-inch deadlift, "which bested the previous world record at a sanctioned event in 1983, according to a news release."

Mark Felix, by invitation, attempted to set a World's Strongest Man record in the Hercules Hold, but did not succeed.

Brian Shaw qualified for a record equalling 12th WSM final, tying the record of Zydrunas Savickas. With all of these finals being consecutive, he also broke his own record for consecutive finals. This was also Shaw's 11th top 5 finish, another record.

Mark Felix appeared in his 15th WSM contest, breaking the record of 14 held by himself and Savickas. Terry Hollands also appeared in his 14th contest.

Final standings

References

External links
 The World's Strongest Man official website

 

World's Strongest Man
2020 in sports in Florida